Siga liris, the moonlight queen, is a moth in the family Crambidae described by Pieter Cramer in 1775. It is found in the West Indies, Peru, Brazil, Suriname, French Guiana, Ecuador and Bolivia. The habitat consists of primary rainforests and cloudforests at altitudes between 400 and 2,000 meters.

References

Moths described in 1775
Spilomelinae
Taxa named by Pieter Cramer
Moths of the Caribbean
Moths of South America